Bob Topping (born in Scotland) is a Canadian architect. Robert Topping earned a Bachelor of Architecture (1979) from Strathclyde University, Glasgow, Scotland before emigrating to Canada. Topping is the president of Designable Environments Inc., and a founding member of the Global Alliance on Accessible Technologies and Environments (GAATES).

Professional life 
Topping has over thirty years of experience practicing and teaching architecture, with a specialization and interest in the fields of barrier-free design and universal design at Humber College and then Sheridan College. Originally in partnership with Carol Kelly and Heather Snell, Topping established Designable Environments Inc. in 1987, but became the sole owner in 2014. Thea Kurdi become a junior partner in 2019.

He has appeared in conferences around the world educating design professionals about universal design as it relates to the built environment, and currently serves as the treasurer on the Global Alliance for Accessible Technologies and Environments (GAATES).

Bob is a registered architect and design consultant with the Ontario Association of Architects and the Royal Architectural Institute of Canada. He is also a member of:
 the B651 Technical Committee of the Canadian Standards Association: Accessible design for the built environment
 the Canadian Committee to the ISO TC 59/SC16: Accessibility and Usability of the Built Environment
 the Use and Egress Technical Committee to the National Building Code of Canada
 the Ontario Home Builders Accessible Housing Design Council

He is the author of "Changes: disability and the challenge of renovation" published in 1985 about his experience renovating a home for a family who had adopted several children with severe disabilities.

Bob was the lead author for the City of London's Facility Accessibility Design Standards (FADS), which has become the basis for over 100 municipal and educational institutions across Ontario. Originally published in 2001, this document was different from other accessibility standards at the time because not only did it include the actual space needs of people with disabilities based on research, but also principals of Universal Design. The document is made available for free by the City of London, Ontario on their website and has been updated twice in 2004 and 2007. A new 2015 version is expected soon, including the revisions to the Ontario Building Code and the new AODA Design of Public spaces legislation.

In 2008, Topping has retired from teaching full-time to focus on his work at DesignABLE Environments. As of December 31, 2021, Bob has retired as president, leaving the company in his protégée, Thea Kurdi's hands.

References

External links 
 Designable Environments Inc. Bob's Mississauga-based company web page
 Universal Soldier Article about his Sheridan Universal Design course
 Accessible Housing by Design — Ramps a CMHC article
 The Seven Deadly Sins assignment

Canadian architects
Living people
Year of birth missing (living people)